In mathematics, the theta operator is a differential operator defined by

 

This is sometimes also called the homogeneity operator, because its eigenfunctions are the monomials in z:

In n variables the homogeneity operator is given by

As in one variable, the eigenspaces of θ are the spaces of homogeneous functions. (Euler's homogeneous function theorem)

See also
 Difference operator
 Delta operator
 Elliptic operator
 Fractional calculus
 Invariant differential operator
 Differential calculus over commutative algebras

References

Further reading

Differential operators